The Cathedral of Saint Thomas More located at 3901 Cathedral Lane is the cathedral of the Roman Catholic Diocese of Arlington Virginia and the seat of Bishop Michael F. Burbidge. The rector of the cathedral is the Very Reverend Patrick L. Posey, V.F. Fr. Posey was appointed in June 2019.The Rev. Robert J. Rippy was the rector from 2005 to 2019. The cathedral also has a Parochial Vicar, two resident priests, Director of Religious Education, Youth Minister and Music & Liturgy Coordinator.

Description
The cathedral is a modern design and is constructed with a basilica floorplan. The exterior is red brick with three doors at the front. The doors are in shallow porticos formed by barrel arches that extend to the roof and contain a stained glass window above each door. The sanctuary houses a three-manual M.P. Moeller organ with 28 ranks of pipes installed in 1961. The organ was redesigned and expanded to 53 ranks in 1980 by organ builder Robert Wyant. Wyant served as cathedral organist from 1964, after two years as assistant was the okayes casthederal  organist, until his retirement in 1998.

History
The parish was established in 1938 and named for St. Thomas More. Until the sanctuary was completed in 1950, Masses were held in what is now the school gymnasium. The current church was constructed in 1961 above the 1950 sanctuary. It was elevated to a cathedral when the northern counties of Virginia split from the Diocese of Richmond to form the Diocese of Arlington and the first bishop was installed on August 13, 1974. The parish currently consists of 2,500 members.

In 1944, the parish established St. Thomas More Cathedral School. It currently offers grade levels pre-kindergarten through eighth and has approximately 400 students. The school was operated by the Sisters, Servants of the Immaculate Heart of Mary who established a permanent community at St. Thomas More August 25, 1945. Due to declining numbers, the order withdrew from the parish in June 1998.

See also

 List of churches in the Roman Catholic Diocese of Arlington
List of Catholic cathedrals in the United States
List of cathedrals in the United States

References

External links

 
 Roman Catholic Diocese of Arlington Official Site

Churches in Arlington County, Virginia
Churches in the Roman Catholic Diocese of Arlington
Thomas More
Christian organizations established in 1938
1938 establishments in Virginia
Roman Catholic churches completed in 1961
20th-century Roman Catholic church buildings in the United States